The TQ-11 (lit. Sky Lark 11) is a gas-generator cycle rocket engine burning liquid methane and liquid oxygen under development by Landspace. It will be used as the second stage vernier engine for Landspace's ZQ-2 rocket. The engine has been designed to produce  of thrust in the vacuum.

History
Landspace completed the first engine hot firing test for TQ-11 on November 3, 2019, and the engine passed a 1500 second test in 2020. On December 14, 2022, Zhuque-2 completed its maiden flight. The TQ-11 engines used in the rocket's second stage failed, resulting in mission failure. LandSpace planned to upgrade the second stage with one TQ-15A engine, eliminating the need for a vernier engine. The failure of TQ-11 could force LandSpace to update the second stage quicker than anticipated.

References

Rocket engines of China
Rocket engines using methane propellant
Rocket engines using the gas-generator cycle